Meadowlark Park may refer to various communities in Alberta, Canada, named for the meadowlark bird:

Meadowlark Park, Edmonton
West Meadowlark Park, Edmonton
Meadowlark Park, Calgary